Gavin Koppel, better known by his stage name DJ Lyfe, is an American musician, record producer, and artist, best known as the former turntablist and co-songwriter of the band Incubus between the years of 1995 and 1998. He is also a graffiti artist.

Career

Koppel got his start in music in 1987. He met the band Incubus, at that time consisting of vocalist Brandon Boyd, guitarist Mike Einziger, drummer José Pasillas, and bassist Alex Katunich in 1994 at the S.I.R. Theater. He joined in 1995 and performed with the band for their 1997 EP, Enjoy Incubus and the following album later that year, S.C.I.E.N.C.E., on turntables under the stage name DJ Lyfe. He is credited as doing "Turntable Kung-Fu" on S.C.I.E.N.C.E.  He also appeared on the track "Familiar" from Spawn: The Album, which Incubus performed with DJ Greyboy. He was replaced by DJ Kilmore after being fired in 1998. In 2003, Koppel sued Incubus for failing to account properly. Koppel's claims were rejected following arbitration in February 2004. In 2010 Kilmore would file a restraining order against Koppel following various online threats in response to the lawsuit.

His graffiti art has been featured on TV show Cold Case Season 7 episode 13.

Discography

With Incubus

The following is a partial discography of Incubus, documenting the main releases on which the DJ is credited.
Enjoy Incubus EP (1997)
S.C.I.E.N.C.E. LP (1997)
Spawn: The Original Soundtrack Compilation (1997)
Monuments and Melodies (Japanese Edition) Compilation (2009)
The Essential Incubus Compilation (2012)

Solo filmography (as a mixtape DJ)
87 Ways DVD Mixtape Vol. 1 (2005) - As DJ 1987

References

American hip hop DJs
Rock DJs
Incubus (band) members
Living people
Place of birth missing (living people)
Year of birth missing (living people)